Hon. Robert L. “Bob” Bailey (August 28, 1922 – February 9, 2018) was an American lawyer, judge, and legislator.

Early life and education 
Bailey was born in Muskogee, Oklahoma, to Robert and Eva Bailey and was raised in Goodman, Missouri.  He attended Northwestern University and the University of Oklahoma College of Law, graduating in 1948.

Military service 
Bailey served as a Navy Seabee in World War II, finished his education, then served in the Korean War in the office of the U.S. Army Judge Advocate General Corps.

Legislative Service 
Bailey was elected to two terms in the Oklahoma House of Representatives, from 1953-1954 and 1955-1956, and one term in the Oklahoma Senate, from 1957-1961.

County Service 
Bailey served as an Assistant County Attorney then County Attorney after winning election in 1951.  He later served as the City Attorney for Moore, Oklahoma and Assistant District Attorney for Cleveland County.

Oklahoma Court of Civil Appeals 
Bailey was elected to the Oklahoma Court of Civil Appeals from 1970-1974 and again from 1987-1994.

Additional Service 
Bailey served on the Oklahoma Pardon and Parole Board, and as an “active retired” District Judge for Cleveland County.  He helped develop and fund the State Highway 9/Interstate 35 bridge over the South Canadian River and Norman’s Lake Thunderbird.  Further, Bailey served as President and Chairman of the Board of Oklahoma National Bank.

References 

1922 births
2018 deaths
Northwestern University alumni
University of Oklahoma College of Law alumni
People from Missouri
Seabees
United States Army Judge Advocate General's Corps